The brilliant South American gecko (Gonatodes ceciliae), also known commonly as the brilliant clawed gecko, is a species of lizard in the family Sphaerodactylidae. The species is native to northern South America.

Etymology
The specific name, ceciliae, is in honor of Cecilia Donoso-Barros, who is the daughter of Chilean herpetologist Roberto Donoso-Barros.

Geographic range
G. ceciliae is found in Trinidad and Venezuela.

Habitat

Description
Only males of G. ceciliae have brilliant coloration. Females are grayish brown, with darker blotches.

Behavior
G. ceciliae is diurnal.

Diet
G. ceciliae preys upon small arthropods and small snails.

Reproduction
G. ceciliae is oviparous.

References

Further reading
Donoso-Barros R (1966). "Dos nuevos Gonatodes de Venezuela". Publicaciones Ocasionales, Museo Nacional de Historia Natural, Santiago de Chile 11: 1–32. (Gonatodes ceciliae, new species). (in Spanish).
Rivas GA, Molina CR, Ugueto GN, Barros TR, Barrio-Amorós CL, Kok PJR (2012). "Reptiles of Venezuela: an updated and commented checklist". Zootaxa 3211: 1–64. (Gonatodes ceciliae, p. 12 + Figure 3F on p. 32). (in English, with an abstract in Spanish).
Rösler H (2000). "Kommentierte Liste der rezent, subrezent und fossil bekannten Geckotaxa (Reptilia: Gekkonomorpha)". Gekkota 2: 28–153. (Gonatodes ceciliae, p. 84). (in German).

Gonatodes
Reptiles described in 1966